is a train station in Takatsuki, Osaka Prefecture, Japan.

Lines
West Japan Railway Company
JR Kyoto Line (Tōkaidō Main Line)

History
Settsu-Tonda Station opened on 25 July 1924.

Station numbering was introduced to the station in March 2018 with Settsu-Tonda being assigned station number JR-A39.

Layout
The station has two island platforms, each of which exclusively serves up or down trains. The outer side of each platform is fenced as all trains on the outer tracks pass through this station without stopping.

Adjacent stations

References

Railway stations in Japan opened in 1924
Railway stations in Osaka Prefecture
Tōkaidō Main Line